William Heffernan (born August 22, 1940) is an American novelist born in New Haven, Connecticut. Before becoming a novelist, Heffernan was an investigative reporter for the New York Daily News. Heffernan left journalism in 1978 after receiving his first book contract for the novel Broderick. He won the Heywood Broun Award twice, received the Robert F. Kennedy Journalism Award and has received a number of other local, state and regional honors. William Heffernan has received the Edgar Award, is a member of the Authors Guild, The Mystery Writers of America, and was once President of the International Association of Crime Writers.  The film rights for The Dinosaur Club were sold to Warner Bros in 1997 for $1 million.

Works
Broderick (1980)
Caging the Raven (1981)
The Corsican (1983)
Acts of Contrition (1986)
Blood Rose (a Paul Devlin series book) (1988)
Ritual (a Paul Devlin series book) (1989)
Corsican Honor (1991)
Scarred (a Paul Devlin series book) (1992)
Tarnished Blue (a Paul Devlin series book) (winner of the Edgar Award for best paperback original) (1993)
Winter's Gold (a Paul Devlin series book)  (1995)
The Dinosaur Club (1997)
Cityside (1997)
Red Angel (a Paul Devlin series book) (1999)
Beulah Hill (2000)
Unholy Order (a Paul Devlin series book) (2000)
A Time Gone By (2003)
The Dead Detective (2010)
When Johnny Came Marching Home (2012)
The Scientology Murders (a Dead Detective series book) (2017)

Translations
A Time Gone By has been translated into Polish:  Czas Przeszly, Wydawnictwo "Amber" Warsaw, 2004

References

External links
An Interview with Heffernan
Fantastic Fiction - William Heffernan
Who Dunnit, William Heffernan

Living people
20th-century American novelists
21st-century American novelists
American male journalists
American male novelists
American mystery writers
Edgar Award winners
1950 births
Writers from New Haven, Connecticut
20th-century American male writers
21st-century American male writers
Novelists from Connecticut
20th-century American non-fiction writers
21st-century American non-fiction writers